Ferriere is a comune (municipality) in the Province of Piacenza in the Italian region Emilia-Romagna, located about  west of Bologna and about  southwest of Piacenza, in the Val Nure of the Ligurian Apennines.

Ferriere borders the following municipalities: Bardi, Bedonia, Cerignale, Coli, Corte Brugnatella, Farini, Ottone, Rezzoaglio, Santo Stefano d'Aveto.

Demographic evolution

References

Cities and towns in Emilia-Romagna